Peerless is a hamlet in Rural Municipality of Beaver River No. 622, Saskatchewan, Canada.

See also
 List of communities in Saskatchewan

References

Beaver River No. 622, Saskatchewan
Unincorporated communities in Saskatchewan